The Battle of Oriamendi (Basque: Oriamendiko Gudua) was a battle fought on 16 March 1837 during the First Carlist War. The battle was an overwhelming victory for the Carlists.

Prelude 
The battle was part of a campaign in spring 1837 when the liberal Army tried to chase the Carlists from the Basque Country. 

General Pedro Sarsfield, marching from Pamplona, was supposed to threaten the Lecumferri pass, while General Espartero was to advance from Bilbao with the purpose of distracting the Carlists. It was planned that the British-Spanish force, starting at San Sebastián, led by George de Lacy Evans would attack the Carlist-held Hernani. This concentric attack was planned by General Sarsfiel with the goal of annihilating Carlist forces.

On 15 March the British Auxiliary Legion conquered a fortification known as Oriamendi on a strategic hill near San Sebastián. The hill was defended by Carlist Guipuzcoans.

Battle 
The next day the Carlists under Sebastian de Borbón counterattacked and routed the liberal forces supported by the British Legion, both of which suffered heavy losses. Due to the battle, the British-liberal army retreated to their trenches outside San Sebastian. This force had suffered between 1,000 and 1,500 casualties and covering fire from the Royal Navy prevented the withdrawal from becoming a disaster. The success of the Carlist troops laid in a defence-in-depth and their infantry's high mobility.

Aftermath 
After the battle, the Carlists tightened their grip around San Sebastián, but never succeeded in taking the city.

The defeat caused an outrage at the British parliament. The battle was a great boost in morale for the Carlists, and lives on in the Marcha de Oriamendi, which became the anthem of the Carlist movement.

See also 
 Battle of Andoain
 Oliver de Lancey
 Maurice O'Connell

References

Sources

External links 

 Balagan
 Historia militar del siglo XIX en el País Vasco

March 1837 events
Oriamendi
Oriamendi
Basque history
Oriamendi